Glycine receptor subunit alpha-2 is a protein that in humans is encoded by the GLRA2 gene.

See also
 Glycine receptor

References

Further reading

External links 
 

Ion channels